La Fargeville United Methodist Church is a historic United Methodist church located at Orleans in Jefferson County, New York. The three bay, gable front main section was built about 1850 in a vernacular Federal / Greek Revival style.  An attached bell tower and parsonage were built in 1873.  Both early structures are wood frame sheathed in clapboard. In 1892 the church was modified to the Akron plan.

It was listed on the National Register of Historic Places in 1996.

References

Churches on the National Register of Historic Places in New York (state)
United Methodist churches in New York (state)
Gothic Revival church buildings in New York (state)
Italianate architecture in New York (state)
Churches completed in 1850
19th-century Methodist church buildings in the United States
Churches in Jefferson County, New York
Akron Plan church buildings
National Register of Historic Places in Jefferson County, New York
Italianate church buildings in the United States